The Coptic Evangelical Organization for Social Services (CEOSS), headquartered in Cairo, Egypt, is an Egyptian Coptic Christian development organization.  It was established in 1960 by the Coptic Evangelical Church, but is now independent.

Reverend Andrea Zaki Stephanous is its General Director.

References

External links
CEOSS website

1960 establishments in Egypt
Charities based in Egypt
Coptic Christianity
Coptic culture
Organisations based in Cairo
Protestantism in Egypt
Religious organisations based in Egypt
Christian organizations established in 1960